Doctor Bedlam is a DC Comics supervillain created by Jack Kirby as part of his Fourth World comic series of the 1970s. He is part of Darkseid's Elite on the planet Apokolips.

His name comes from the Bethlem Royal Hospital insane asylum, and is a reference to his madness-inducing "paranoid pill".

Publication history
Doctor Bedlam first appeared in Mister Miracle #3 (July–August 1971) and was created by Jack Kirby.

Fictional character biography
Doctor Bedlam's early life is unknown, save that he once possessed a physical body that was somehow transformed into pure psionic energy. His primary foe is Mister Miracle whom he has never defeated.

Following the destruction of Apokolips and New Genesis, Doctor Bedlam relocates to Earth, where he attracts the new Mister Miracle's attention by becoming an escape artist under the name Baron Bedlam. He wears a costume which is a negative copy of the new Mister Miracle's outfit. He is not, in fact, a good escape artist, but does not need to be; one android body is destroyed by the traps, and he relocates to another one, which then appears from backstage.

Bedlam is a featured character in Underworld Unleashed: Apokolips - Dark Uprising #1 (1995). With Darkseid missing, the various factions of Apokolips form plans; Granny Goodness sends several of her students to kill Bedlam. They seemingly succeed but again, he has transferred his mind to another body just in time.

Seven Soldiers
Grant Morrison revamped Baron Bedlam in Seven Soldiers: Mister Miracle as a rival escape-artist stealing Shilo's fame. In this incarnation, the Baron's bodies are blonde, Caucasian males whose suit is an inversion of Shilo's. The Baron performed inescapable death traps, destroying the body he was currently using and inhabiting a replacement, via the Bedlam Beat, stashed nearby to make it seem like he escaped unharmed. His popularity grew to a point that he had his own cult following of Plastic People, fans whose bodies were transformed in a surgical process involving enamel. Most of the events in this story were revealed to take place in an alternative timeline, so there is a possibility that it did not happen.

Death of the New Gods
Doctor Bedlam appears in the first issue of the Death of the New Gods limited series. When New Gods are being hunted down across the galaxy, one of Bedlam's android forms is found damaged. Bedlam's consciousness cannot be located, hence it is assumed that Bedlam has become the victim of the Infinity-Man who had been responsible for killing numerous other New Gods.

The New 52
In The New 52, Doctor Bedlam is reintroduced on Earth-2 as a member of Steppenwolf's Hunger Dogs.

Powers and abilities
Doctor Bedlam exists as a being of pure psionic energy and is typically invisible but can make himself appear in the form of the face he once had in his physical form. Doctor Bedlam psionically commands powerful androids known as animates. These animates have superhuman strength, are able to break steel with their hands, and possess incredible durability. He can control multiple animates at once, even enough to form an army. He can also project himself into one of the animates to temporarily attain physical form.

If it is possible to kill him, it would be extremely difficult since he can abandon any of his android bodies that are harmed.

Doctor Bedlam is a master scientist who specializes in devising means of inducing terror in the minds of his victims through his powers of mental manipulation and paranoia. One of his most infamous tools is a "paranoid pill" which releases a gas that can drive anyone exposed to it temporarily insane with fear and hatred.

In other media
 Dr. Bedlam has appeared as a background character in Darkseid's Elite in the DC Animated Universe.

Miscellaneous
 Bedlam appears in an issue of a Batman: The Brave and the Bold tie-in comic.

References

External links
 Doctor Bedlam at the Unofficial Guide to the DC Universe

New Gods of Apokolips
Comics characters introduced in 1971
Characters created by Jack Kirby
DC Comics aliens
DC Comics deities
DC Comics demons 
DC Comics characters who have mental powers
DC Comics telepaths
Fictional characters with immortality